is a Japanese anime series created by GoDo, directed by Shigenori Kageyama, and produced by Genco. It was aired on Chiba TV from April 8, 2006 to July 1, 2006 and afterwards got a second season, and a short manga to connect the two, .

Plot
Kasumi Kogen, which translates to "The Village of Mist", is a town somewhere in rural Japan. In this town there is a school, the Shinobi Gakuen, where competent female students gather from all over Japan and train to become kunoichi (female ninja). The people of Kasumi Kogen are alumni of the school, and they run and jump and disappear as if the whole town were a big ninja house.

The story begins as a girl, Himawari Hinata, arrives in Kasumi Kogen. She has transferred to Shinobi Gakuen to train under Ichikawa Raiso and fulfill a dream of becoming a kunoichi that she has fostered since she was saved by one in her childhood. On her first day, she meets Hayato Marikoji, a teacher who is himself just arriving at Shinobi Gakuen, and he saves her life. Hayato does not possess any ninja skills; he is teaching the students about normal Japanese society in order to pay a large debt that was originally his friend's debt but was passed down to him. However, Himawari notices that Hayato bears the same mark on his neck as the ninja who saved her when she was young.

Himawari! is the story of Himawari and her journey to become a kunoichi, and the vow she makes to protect her teacher.

Characters
 
 
 The female lead of the story. She was rescued by a ninja with an odd mark on his neck. Ever since then, she had sworn to become a ninja. The story begins with her trying to gain entry into the ninja academy.
 She meets Marikoji Hayato, the male lead, after a foul-up of her training (hangliding on a kite) which causes her to become stuck on a giant gate pole. Hayato attempts to rescue her, leading her to refer to him from then on as "Hayato-dono" (dono is a suffix used for samurai to respect their honor). Her one and only dream is to become a great kunoichi despite her classmates finding her annoying and unskilled.
 
 
 A single, 24-year-old man who took the job as a teacher in order to settle a two million yen debt. Hayato wanted to quit his job when he found that the whole village is not normal and that the students he was teaching were ninja, but Himawari's rescue from being run over by a train had changed his mind.
 Hayato doesn't fit in with the surroundings but manages to find a way to survive.  For Hayato, it's his luck, his ducking ability when confronted with someone more skilled than he is, and some of his students taking a shine to him.  On top of that, Hayato is skilled at throwing darts, which translates into moderate skill throwing kunai.
 Because of his debt, Hayato spends most of the series trying desperately to earn money. This also results in Hayato spending much of the series scrounging for food.
 
 
 Azami is a collector of (sometimes useless) information.  He's strong-minded and high-spirited. He masquerades as a girl in order to attend the girls' school in which he acts as a spy for the students of a nearby boys' ninja school. This situation is known by the girls' school and tolerated since Azami also provides information about the boys' ninja school.
 
 
 A grey-haired kunoichi-in-training who wears glasses. She is very knowledgeable about medicinal herbs and is among the more serious students in the ninja academy. One exception to her seriousness is that she keeps secret contact with Nanafushi, a male ninja from the boys' ninja school. Her ninja teleportation is slow, warping the scene, unlike the other ninja. She sometimes lets her hair down.
 
 
 Yusura is a cute, young animal-themed kunoichi-in-training. She has panda-like paws, a tail, and animal ears and frequently compares various things to other animals. She is also shown to have the ability to converse with animals, and accordingly is in a relationship with Yonezawa, a kappa.
 
 
 Yusura's pet animal whose attacks consist of farting. Yusura nursed it to health when it was injured, starting their friendship. So it gets jealous when it sees her with anyone else, especially Yonesawa.
 
 
 This dark-skinned, strangely speaking kunoichi-in-training is an expert in weaponry; carrying and using guns without restraint. She also uses a large sword. Himeji is half-American and dislikes cold temperatures.
 
 
 This traditionally clad young woman with a mysterious demeanor and elf ears is another kunoichi-in-training who doesn't appear very often. When she does, she's always eating miso soup. She either gives advice, shows the major characters what's concurrent events through her miso soup, gives someone the miso soup to eat, or some combination of the above.
 
 
 He and Shikimi meet when she finds him in bottom of a pit in the mountains, immobilized by a leg injury. Though the two have good rapport, which others take to suggest romance, they maintain a casual friendship with limited contact. Nanafushi makes occasional appearances in times of need.
  (The Boss), Yui Kano (Wabisuke), Miho Miyagawa (Sabisuke)
 "The Boss" is a green-haired woman who rescued two kids, Wabisuke and Sabisuke, who have since been her subordinates. She believes that Hayato is a descendant of someone who killed her ancestors (later revealed to be Oda Nobunaga). After many bungled assassination attempts and suffering from being at the wrong place at the wrong time, she learns that Hayato is not her enemy.
 
 
 A surprisingly friendly kappa. He is Yusura's boyfriend. He likes to eat cucumbers.

Anime

 Theme Music
The opening theme for the first season is Taiyō no Kakera" by Ryōko Shiraishi while the ending theme is "Guruguru ~Himawari ver.~" by Eufonius. For the second season, the opening theme is "Sorairo no Tsubasa" by Ryōko Shiraishi and the ending theme changes for various episodes - "Kirakira" by Eufonius (episodes 1, 8, and 13), Aya Hirano (episodes 2, 9, and 12), Kana Matsumoto (episodes 3, 6, and 10), Mayumi Yoshida (episode 4), Ryoko Shiraishi (episodes 5 and 11), and Asumi Nakata (episode 7).

Series overview

Episode list

Season 1 (2006)

Season 2 Himawari!! (2007)

External links
Official website 

2006 manga
Arms Corporation
Maiden Japan
Ninja in anime and manga
Anime series
Anime with original screenplays
Hakusensha franchises
Hakusensha manga
Seinen manga